Cross Winds is the fortieth studio album by American country music singer Conway Twitty. The album was released in 1979, by MCA Records.

Track listing

Charts

Weekly charts

Year-end charts

References

1979 albums
Conway Twitty albums
MCA Records albums